Gerbier is a surname. Notable people with the name include:

Balthazar Gerbier (1592–1663), Anglo-Dutch courtier, diplomat, art advisor, miniaturist and architectural designer
George Gerbier d'Ouvilly (fl. 1661), Dutch soldier, dramatist and translator
Max Gerbier (born 1951), Haitian painter
Thierry Gerbier (1965–2013), French biathlete

See also
Mont Gerbier de Jonc, a mountain of volcanic origin in the Massif Central in France